Thomas Young may refer to:

Military
 Thomas Young (American revolutionary) (1731–1777), member of the Sons of Liberty
 Thomas James Young (1827–1869), recipient of the Victoria Cross during the Indian mutiny
 Thomas Young (VC) (1895–1966), recipient of the Victoria Cross during World War I
 Tomas Young (1979–2014), Iraq War veteran, subject of the documentary Body of War

Politics
 Thomas Young (MP for Shropshire), MP for Shropshire four times between 1380 and 1399
 Thomas Young (MP for Winchelsea), 1413–1425, MP for Winchelsea
 Thomas Young (died 1427), MP for Bristol 1414
 Thomas Yonge or Young, MP for Bristol (1435–1453, 1455) and Gloustershire, justice of the Common Pleas and the King's Bench
 Thomas Ainslie Young (1797–1860), official and political figure in Lower Canada
 Thomas Young (Australian politician) (1813–1904), South Australian MHA
 Thomas L. Young (1832–1888), governor of Ohio
 Thomas Ganley Young (born 1947), mayor of Syracuse, New York, 1986–1993

Religion
 Thomas Young (bishop) (1507–1568), Archbishop of York
 Thomas Young (theologian) (1587–1655), Scottish Presbyterian and author
 Thomas Cullen Young (1880–1955), Scottish Presbyterian anthropologist and missionary

Sports
 Thomas Jefferson Young (born 1902), Negro leagues baseball player
 Thomas Young (rugby union) (born 1992), Welsh rugby union player
 Thomas Young (swimmer) (born 1991), British Paralympic swimmer
 Thomas Young (footballer), Scottish footballer
 Tommy Young (born 1947), wrestler
 Thomas Young (sprinter) (born 2000), British Paralympic sprinter

Other
 Thomas Young (developer) (c. 1650–?), English woodcarver and property developer
 Thomas Young (scientist) (1773–1829), British polymath, scientist and Egyptologist
 Thomas Young (entrepreneur) (1895–1971), founder of YESCO, a Las Vegas corporation, in 1920
 Thomas Young (tenor), American operatic tenor
 Thomas Daniel Young (1919–1997), American professor of Southern literature
 Tommie Young (born 1949), U.S. singer
 Thomas Young (mass murderer) (1931–1959), Canadian mass murderer

See also 
 Thomas Youngs (disambiguation)
 Thomas Young Duncan (1836–1914), New Zealand politician
 Tom Young (disambiguation)